Jäger (also Jager, Jaeger, or Jæger) is a common German surname. It comes from the German word for "hunter". Related surnames in other languages include De Jager, Jääger, Jágr, Yaeger and Yeager.

The surname may refer to:

In arts and entertainment

Acting
Frederick Jaeger (1928–2004), German-born actor
Professor Jager, stage name of Scott Folsom, co-founder of the League of STEAM performance troupe

Fictional characters
Eren Jaeger, the main protagonist of the manga series Attack on Titan and its anime adaptation
Zeke Jaeger, the older brother of Eren Jaeger of the manga series Attack on Titan and anime adaptation
Grisha Jaeger, the father of Eren and Zeke from manga series Attack on Titan and anime adaptation

Music
August Jaeger (1860–1909), English music publisher of German extraction, the "Nimrod" of Edward Elgar's composition
Finne Jager, trance music DJ from the Netherlands
Marike Jager (born 1979), singer, guitarist and composer from the Netherlands
Robert E. Jager (born 1939), US composer

Production
 Patrick Jager (born 1968), US television producer and executive

Visual arts
Alex Jaeger, American art director and costume designer
Gerrit de Jager (born 1954), Dutch comic-artist
Gustav Jaeger (painter) (1808–1871), German painter
Michael Jäger (artist) (born 1956), German artist
Stefan Jäger (1877–1962), painter

Writing
Frank Jæger (1926–1977), Danish poet
Hans Jæger (1854–1910), Norwegian writer, philosopher and political activist

In government and politics
Alvin Jaeger (born 1943), politician
Friedrich Gustav Jaeger (1895–1944), resistance fighter in Nazi Germany and a member of the 20 July Plot
Hans Jæger (1854–1910), Norwegian writer, philosopher and political activist
Jan Kees de Jager (born 1969), IT entrepreneur and politician in the Netherlands
Karl Jäger (1888–1959), Swiss-born Nazi leader, commander of the SD Einsatzkommando 3
Richard Jaeger (1913–1998), German politician

In religion
Jacob de Jager (1923–2004), general authority of The Church of Jesus Christ of Latter-day Saints
Lorenz Jaeger (1892–1975), German prelate of the Roman Catholic Church
Maximilian Jaeger (1915–1999), Swiss Minister in Budapest from 1936 to 1944
Willigis Jäger (1925–2020), German Benedictine friar, mystic, and Zen master

In science and academia
Edmund Jaeger (1887–1983), US biologist
Eduard Jäger von Jaxtthal (1818–1884), Austrian ophthalmologist
Eric Jager (born 1957), professor in the department of English at University of California, Los Angeles
Frans Maurits Jaeger (1877–1945), Dutch chemist
Gustav Jäger (naturalist) (1832–1917), German naturalist and doctor
Hermann Jaeger (1844–?), Swiss oenologist
Marilyn Jager Adams (born 1948), researcher in the areas of cognition and education
Peter Jäger, German arachnologist
Werner Jaeger (1888–1961), German classicist

In sport
Adolf Jäger (1889–1944), German amateur football (soccer) player
Andrea Jaeger (born 1965), American tennis player and humanitarian
Eric Jagers (born 1995), American baseball coach
Gisela Jäger, German rower
Jaromír Jágr (born 1972), Czech ice hockey player
Jeff Jaeger (born 1964), former American football place-kicker
Jens Jäger (born 1963), German wheelchair curler, 2010 Winter Paralympian
Jonathan Jäger (born 1978), French-born German professional footballer
Martin Jágr (born 1979), Czech rugby union player
Peta Taylor (married name Mary Jaegar, 1912–1989), English cricketer
Thomas Jäger (born 1976), German racing driver
Tom Jager (born 1964), US freestyle swimmer
Werner Jäger (born 1959), Austrian ice speed skater
Evan Jager (born 1989), 3000m Steeplechase silver medalist in 2016 Rio Olympics

In other fields
August Jäger (21 August 1887 – 17 June 1949), German official of the Nazi era.
Jan Kees de Jager (born 1969), IT entrepreneur and politician in the Netherlands

See also
De Jager, Dutch variant
Jágr (surname), Czech variant
Yeager (surname)
Yaeger (surname)
Jagger (disambiguation)

See also 

German-language surnames
Occupational surnames